The 1912 Florida gubernatorial election was held on November 5, 1912. Incumbent Governor Albert W. Gilchrist was term-limited. Democratic nominee Park Trammell was elected with 80.42% of the vote.

Democratic primary
Primary elections were held on April 30, 1912. The Democratic State Committee canvassed the results on May 9.

Candidates
Cromwell Gibbons, former Speaker of the Florida House of Representatives
William Hall Milton, former U.S. Senator
Edward Manly Semple, attorney
Park Trammell, incumbent Attorney General of Florida
John W. Watson, former Speaker of the Florida House of Representatives

Results

Run-off

A run-off between the top two candidates was scheduled for May 28. However, on May 10, Milton withdrew, leaving Trammell the nominee.

General election

Candidates
J. W. Bingham, Prohibition
Thomas W. Cox, Socialist, unsuccessful candidate for Florida's 2nd congressional district in 1910
William C. Hodges, Progressive
William R. O'Neal, Republican, unsuccessful candidate for Florida's 2nd congressional district in 1908
Park Trammell, Democratic

Results

County results

References

Bibliography
 
 
 
 

1912
Florida
Gubernatorial
November 1912 events in the United States